Empress Wu is a 1984 Hong Kong television serial based on the biography of Wu Zetian (Cantonese: Mou Zak-tin), the only woman in Chinese history to assume the title of "Empress Regnant", starring Petrina Fung as the title character. The serial was produced by ATV and was first aired in Hong Kong on ATV Home from 6 August to 28 September 1984.

It was shown with English subtitles in Australia on SBS from 1987 to 1990.

A dubbed English version of the serial was broadcast in the United Kingdom on Channel 4 in sixty-five weekly 30-minute episodes from 4 October 1987 to 21 January 1989.

Cast
 Note: Some of the characters' names are in Cantonese romanisation.

 Petrina Fung as Mou Zak-tin
 Tony Liu / Savio Tsang as Ming Sung-yim
 Lo Chun-shun as Tong Ko-tsung
 Pat Poon as Yu-man Chun
 Lau Hung-fong as Sheung-koon Yuen-yee
 Ban Ban as Empress Wong
 Chan Choi-yin as Consort Siu
 Kong Hon as Tong Toi-tsung
 Pamela Peck as Empress Cheung-suen
 Eric Wan as Lei Yin
 Wong Siu-fung as Ha Fei-yin
 Lee Ngoi-wah as Lady of Ngai
 Ling Man-hoi as Cheung-suen Mo-gei
 Simon Chui as Yuen Tin-gong
 Lee Kwok-fai as Lei Toi
 Tong Pan-cheung as Ching-sum

References

Asia Television original programming
1984 Hong Kong television series debuts
1984 Hong Kong television series endings
Television series set in the Tang dynasty
Television series set in the Zhou dynasty (690–705)
Works about Wu Zetian
Cultural depictions of Wu Zetian
Cantonese-language television shows
Television series set in the 7th century